Josef Papp (1933? in Tatabánya, Hungary – April 1989 in Daytona Beach, Florida) was an engineer who was awarded U.S. patents related to the development of an engine, and also claimed to have invented a jet submarine.

Papp was issued several U.S. patents for these inventions, including his noble gas fuel mixture.

The engine continues to be considered by many scientists as a hoax. Papp's poor physics theoretic background is demonstrated in the abstracts of the patents, which had been criticized by Richard Feynman. Supposedly— no confirmation has been found in contemporary sources and — Papp presented to an audience, including Feynman, an ill-fated  demonstration in 1966, in which his engine exploded, killing one man (never identified in later accounts) and seriously injuring two others   Feynman is said to have written an article for "LASER, Journal of the Southern Californian Skeptics" (reproduced in text form by the Museum of Hoaxes) asserting that Papp was a fraudster and the explosion an attempt by Papp to avoid discovery, although he notes that Caltech settled with Papp out of court.

See also
List of hoaxes
History of perpetual motion machines#1951 to 1980

Notes

External links
 Papp submarine page in the museum of hoaxes
 
 
 
 

1930s births
1989 deaths
20th-century Canadian engineers
20th-century Hungarian engineers
Submarines
Hungarian emigrants to the United States
Hoaxes in the United States
20th-century hoaxes